Hey DJ may refer to:

 Hey DJ (film), a 2003 American film
 "Hey DJ" (The World's Famous Supreme Team song), 1984
 "Hey DJ" (CNCO song), 2017
 "Hey DJ", a song by Suburban Legends from their EP Dance Like Nobody's Watching
 "Hey DJ! (Play That Song)", a song by N-Tyce from All Day Every Day

See also
 Hey Mr. DJ (disambiguation)